Tisseyre is a French surname. Notable people with the surname include:

Magali Tisseyre (born 1981), Canadian triathlete
Marc Tisseyre, French rugby league player
Michelle Tisseyre (1918–2014), Canadian television presenter, journalist and translator
Pierre Tisseyre (1909–1995), French-born Canadian lawyer, journalist, writer and editor
Yoan Tisseyre (born 1989), French rugby union player

French-language surnames